Fellows is a census-designated place (CDP) in Kern County, California, United States. The population was 106 at the 2010 census, down from 153 at the 2000 census. Fellows is surrounded on all sides by the enormous Midway-Sunset Oil Field, the third-largest oil field in the United States, and the oil and gas industry accounts for much of the area's economic activity.

Geography

History
Fellows developed as an oil boomtown after the 1909 discovery of the Midway Gusher. The first post office at Fellows opened in 1910. The name Fellows honors Charles A. Fellows, a Sunset Western Railroad contractor.

Perhaps Fellows' greatest claim to fame was as the location of a fictional event.  The 1969 educational film The Lottery, based on the famous short story by Shirley Jackson, was shot at Fellows.  It featured a small town much like thousands of others across America holding an apparently ordinary, mundane civic event that had a cold-blooded, horrifying ending to an unfortunate victim come from out-of-nowhere.  The film was ranked as one of the two bestselling educational films ever and has been widely shown in educational settings across America as an indictment against unthinking adherence to tradition and general inhumanity.

Demographics

2010
At the 2010 census Fellows had a population of 106. The racial makeup of Fellows was 94 (88.7%) White, 1 (0.9%) African American, 5 (4.7%) Native American, 0 (0.0%) Asian, 0 (0.0%) Pacific Islander, 2 (1.9%) from other races, and 4 (3.8%) from two or more races. Hispanic or Latino of any race were 11 people (10.4%).

The whole population lived in households, no one lived in non-institutionalized group quarters and no one was institutionalized.

There were 37 households, 17 (45.9%) had children under the age of 18 living in them, 25 (67.6%) were opposite-sex married couples living together, 6 (16.2%) had a female householder with no husband present, 1 (2.7%) had a male householder with no wife present.  There were 1 (2.7%) unmarried opposite-sex partnerships, and 0 (0%) same-sex married couples or partnerships. 4 households (10.8%) were one person and 1 (2.7%) had someone living alone who was 65 or older. The average household size was 2.86.  There were 32 families (86.5% of households); the average family size was 3.06.

The age distribution was 29 people (27.4%) under the age of 18, 8 people (7.5%) aged 18 to 24, 19 people (17.9%) aged 25 to 44, 38 people (35.8%) aged 45 to 64, and 12 people (11.3%) who were 65 or older.  The median age was 40.0 years. For every 100 females, there were 116.3 males.  For every 100 females age 18 and over, there were 102.6 males.

There were 40 housing units at an average density of 60.9 per square mile, of the occupied units 33 (89.2%) were owner-occupied and 4 (10.8%) were rented. The homeowner vacancy rate was 2.9%; the rental vacancy rate was 0%.  91 people (85.8% of the population) lived in owner-occupied housing units and 15 people (14.2%) lived in rental housing units.

2000
At the 2000 census there were 153 people, 56 households, and 39 families in the CDP. The racial makeup of the CDP was 88.89% White, 1.96% Native American, 1.31% Asian, 0.65% Pacific Islander, 6.54% from other races, and 0.65% from two or more races. 14.38% of the population were Hispanic or Latino of any race.
Of the 56 households 28.6% had children under the age of 18 living with them, 58.9% were married couples living together, 8.9% had a female householder with no husband present, and 28.6% were non-families. 19.6% of households were one person and 7.1% were one person aged 65 or older. The average household size was 2.73 and the average family size was 3.10.

The age distribution was 28.1% under the age of 18, 7.2% from 18 to 24, 22.2% from 25 to 44, 26.1% from 45 to 64, and 16.3% 65 or older. The median age was 41 years. For every 100 females, there were 101.3 males. For every 100 females age 18 and over, there were 93.0 males.

The median household income was $30,417 and the median family income  was $30,000. Males had a median income of $36,250 versus $20,781 for females. The per capita income for the CDP was $15,636. About 17.5% of families and 17.4% of the population were below the poverty line, including 36.7% of those under the age of eighteen and none of those sixty five or over.

See also
Midway Field Well 2-6
California Historical Landmarks in Kern County
California Historical Landmark

References

Census-designated places in Kern County, California
Census-designated places in California